The Office of the Administrative Assistant to the Secretary of the Army (OAA) has a primary mission, as specified in Title 10 of the United States Code and reiterated in General Orders and Regulations, to provide direct administrative and management support to HQDA and enterprise level services to Armywide organizations.

History 
In 1789 Congress enacted legislation that provided for a Chief Clerk to assist the Secretary of War. As the United States grew, the duties and responsibilities for the Office of the Chief Clerk also grew. The associated bodies significantly expanded and the title changed. The office is known today as the Office of the Administrative Assistant (OAA) to the Secretary of the Army.

Motto 
Customer Service and Workforce Excellence

Vision 
An innovative, results-oriented organization recognized for customer service and workforce excellence.

Mission
The Office of the Administrative Assistant (OAA) provides direct administrative and management support to HQDA and enterprise level services to Armywide organizations.

Organizational structure 
OAA has two principle components and a multitude of sub-components shown below.

 OAA Headquarters
 Staff Action Control Office
 Chief Attorney
 Civilian Aides to the Secretary of the Army
 Information Technology Management Office
 United States Army Headquarters Support Agency (HSA)
 Human Resource Management Directorate
 Diversity and Equal Employment Opportunity Directorate
 Special Programs Directorate
 Real Estate and Facilities-Army Directorate
 Resource Services Directorate
 Security, Protection and Safety Directorate
 Army Executive Dining Facility

See also
 List of positions filled by presidential appointment with Senate confirmation
 Title 10 of the United States Code

Notes and references

External links
 

 
 
United States Army civilians